Observatory Road is one of the oldest roads in Hong Kong, and has existed since 1883. It is called so because this is where the Hong Kong Observatory was constructed. The Observatory is still in operation and provides updated typhoon information and other services for the Northwest Pacific area.

Description
Observatory Road is located in the Tsim Sha Tsui area of the Kowloon Peninsula and is about 200 metres in length. Despite its relatively short length, however, it is a significant historical area especially since some buildings from the old era still stand alongside the newer imposing structures of modern Kowloon. The road runs uphills and downhills on the Observatory Hill.

Observatory Road connects to Chatham Road South at one end and Nathan Road at the other. The part of the Road crossing the Hong Kong Observatory compound is not open to the public. Among the other familiar places around this area are the Hong Kong Museum of History, the Science Museum, Energy Plaza with its Clock Fountain, Mira Place, Ramada Hotel, and of course, the Hong Kong Observatory itself.

Intersections

See also
List of streets and roads in Hong Kong

References

External links

Google Maps of Observatory Road

Roads in Kowloon
Odonyms referring to a building
Tsim Sha Tsui